Christian Ludvig Diriks (16 October 1802 – 9 July 1873) was Norwegian  government minister and general auditor. 

Diriks was born in Copenhagen, Denmark. He was the son of Norwegian statesman Christian Adolph Diriks.  He grew up in Laurvig (now Larvik), Norway where his father was Magistrate and Judge. He was cand. jur. in 1830 and an auditor in 1833. In 1840 he became a member of the Military Law Commission. He served as Minister of Auditing for two brief periods in 1856 and 1857, and later as temporary Minister of Postal Affairs in 1861.

He was married to Henriette Benedicte Munch (1823-1912) and was father of painter Edvard Diriks.

References

1802 births
1873 deaths
Government ministers of Norway
19th-century Norwegian people